A. J. Mohammad Ali served as the 12th Attorney General of Bangladesh, from 2005 to 2007.

Career
Ali's father MH Khandaker was the first Attorney General of Bangladesh. Ali was enrolled to practise in the High Court in 1980 and in the Appellate Division in 1985. He was appointed Additional Attorney General on October 23, 2001 and as the Attorney General on April 30, 2005. He resigned from the position on January 24, 2007.

Ali served as the President of Supreme Court Bar  Association and Bangladesh Bar Council's Executive Committee Chairman.

Ali served as the lawyer of former Prime Minister of Bangladesh Begum Khaleda Zia for the Zia Orphanage Trust corruption case. He was also the lawyer of Moudud Ahmed.

References

Attorneys General of Bangladesh
20th-century Bangladeshi lawyers
Living people
Year of birth missing (living people)
21st-century Bangladeshi lawyers